A Hell of a Story is a concert film by comedian Kathy Griffin, and her twenty-first special overall. Griffin self-financed the film, which was recorded on October 29, 2018 at the Santa Monica College Performing Arts Center. The special was turned down by every television network and streaming service Griffin pitched to. It premiered on March 11, 2019 at South by Southwest.  It was given a single-day theatrical release by Fathom Events on July 31, 2019 and released on video on demand on August 13.

References

External links
Kathy Griffin's Official Website

 

Kathy Griffin albums
Stand-up comedy albums
2019 live albums